Borel space may refer to:

 any measurable space
 a measurable space that is Borel isomorphic to a measurable subset of the real numbers

See also
Standard Borel space